Rasuwa District ( is one of 13 districts of Bagmati Province and one of seventy-seven districts of Nepal. As per census 2011 total households in Rasuwa district is 9,778. It is the smallest district by area, among 16 districts in the Himalaya region of Nepal.

Etymology
Origin of its name had begun as 'Rasowa' which is believed to be derived as a combination of two Tibetan words ra (meaning: lambs) and sowa (meaning: grazing) as it was known for its lamb and grazing lands. And later people started to call it Rasuwa.

Geography and climate

Forests cover 31.43% of the land while 16.63% is always snow-covered. Steeply varying territory and plenty of natural blessings make Rasuwa a well-known tourist destination in Nepal. Sightseeing places including Gosaikunda Lake, Langtang valley plus one of the hot springs in Nepal (locally called Tatopani) are located in the district.

Demographics
At the time of the 2011 Nepal census, Rasuwa District had a population of 43,300. Of these, 68.2% spoke Tamang, 26.5% Nepali, 1.7% Tibetan, 1.1% Gurung, 0.7% Newari, 0.6% Sherpa, 0.3% Maithili, 0.2% Ghale, 0.2% Magar, 0.2% Yolmo and 0.4% other languages as their first language.

In terms of ethnicity/caste, 69.6% were Tamang, 15.2% Hill Brahmin, 3.1% Gurung, 2.4% Ghale, 2.3% Newar, 2.0% Chhetri, 1.9% Kami, 1.2% Magar, 1.0% Damai/Dholi, 0.2% Yolmo, 0.1% Badi, 0.1% Gharti/Bhujel, 0.1% Sherpa and 0.7% others.

In terms of religion, 70.0% were Buddhist, 25.4% Hindu, 4.3% Christian, 0.1% Prakriti and 0.3% others.

In terms of literacy, 52.3% could read and write, 3.0% could only read and 44.6% could neither read nor write.

Administrative divisions
The administrative division of Rasuwa comprised 5 Rural Municipalities.

Following are five Rural Municipalities in Rasuwa District:

Many leaders of different parties are here but only 5 mayors are here. Nepali Congress won 2 places, 
CPN UML won 2 place and Rastriya Prajatantrik Party won 1 seat/place. The first ever person who 
was elected in Rasuwa from Nepali Congress was Mr. Bal Chandra Poudel (2046 B.S). The history of other 
parties are not commenced yet but this district in Nepal is also the one with no VDC. The winner of election 
2070 BS in this district is Mr. Janardan Dhakal.

Transportation
As of 2013, 3 VDCs namely Thuman, Langtang and Haku are not touched by any kind of roadway.

Tourism

Rasuwa is rich in natural resources. Langtang mountain range stands to the north of Rasuwa. The northern parts of the area largely fall within the boundaries of Langtang National Park. Gosainkunda Lake, Ganja La Pass, and Tamang village in Bridim are the major highlights of Rasuwa for tourism. The Gosainkunda Lake, also known as "Frozen Lake", is a mountain lake in the Langtang region. There are about 108  (lakes) in this area. Saraswati Kund, Bhairab Kund, Surya Kund and Gosainkund are most important ones.

Langtang valley is another attraction in Rasuwa which is aptly called the valley of glaciers; mountains rise soaring toward the sky. The valley offers pine forest, swift mountain streams, rugged rock and snow-capped peaks, grassy down and meadows strewn with daisies and wild animals.

References

 Rasuwa District Profile 2011
 

 
Districts of Nepal established in 1962
Districts of Bagmati Province
Himalayas